Josh Mancell (born November 13, 1969) is an American composer and multi-instrumentalist who writes music for film, television, and video games. He is best known for his work on the Crash Bandicoot and Jak and Daxter series of video games.

Mancell has received two Daytime Emmy Award nominations for his work on the children's television series, Clifford the Big Red Dog.

Early life and education
Mancell was born on November 13, 1969 in Ann Arbor, Michigan. He attended Sarah Lawrence College.

As a child, Mancell learned to play the piano, drums, and guitar and was a "rabid record geek". The exposure of playing music in different types of bands (such as punk rock, jazz, marching bands, and orchestras), combined with fandom in many genres, led Mancell to pursue a composing career. He was encouraged by his college professors to move to Los Angeles to write music for film and television.

Career
Mancell has developed a successful career writing musical scores for film and television. In film, he has scored a range of films such as Bongwater (starring Luke Wilson, Alicia Witt and Jack Black) and Love Comes to the Executioner (starring Jonathan Tucker, Ginnifer Goodwin and Jeremy Renner) as well as contributing music to the cult indie Chuck & Buck (Independent Spirit Award winner).

Mancell's music has been used for the animated television shows Gary the Rat (starring Kelsey Grammer), Shorty McShorts' Shorts (starring Wilmer Valderrama), and Clifford the Big Red Dog (starring John Ritter), which has earned him two Emmy nominations.

Mancell is known for his music in video games including Sony's Crash Bandicoot and Jak and Daxter series, and other titles such as Johnny Mnemonic: The Interactive Action Movie and Interstate '82. This work was done with the assistance of Mutato Muzika, the music production company which Mark Mothersbaugh formed with several other former members of Devo including his brother, Bob Mothersbaugh.

Musical groups
Mancell has been a member of the following bands and musical groups outside of his solo composing career:
 The Millionaires – punk rock/garage band (1995–1996)
 Uluteka  – acid jazz/lounge band (1996)
 Mutato Muzika  – music production company (1992–2007)
 The Dining Room Set  – power pop/mod/soul (1999)
 The Wipeouters  – surf/electronic (2001)
 The Moon Upstairs – psychedelic rock (2006–2010)
 Exploding Flowers  – pop/post-punk/power pop (2010–present)

Musical style and influences
Mancell's influences include electronic artists such as Mouse on Mars, A Guy Called Gerald, Aphex Twin, Juan Atkins, Richard H. Kirk and Kraftwerk, as well as progressive rock band Pink Floyd. He has cited their "interesting rhythmic elements" and said that "melodically they're simple but kind of leftfield too".

Works

Video games

Film

Television 
Adventures in Wonderland (1992) – with Mark Mothersbaugh
 Futurequest (1994)
 Clifford the Big Red Dog (2000) – with Mark Mothersbaugh
 The Groovenians – with Mark Mothersbaugh, Bob Casale, Albert Fox, Al Mothersbaugh, Bob Mothersbaugh, Andrew Todd, and Pat Irwin (additional music)
 Gary the Rat (2003)
 Shorty McShorts' Shorts (2006) ("Dudley and Nestor Do Nothing")
 The Bite-Sized Adventures of Sam Sandwich (2011)

Award nominations
Daytime Emmy Awards

References

External links
 
 
 
 Exploding Flowers Blog

1969 births
20th-century American composers
21st-century American composers
American film score composers
American multi-instrumentalists
American television composers
Crash Bandicoot
Living people
American male film score composers
Male television composers
Musicians from Ann Arbor, Michigan
Video game composers